Avoca River-Bottom Prairie or Avoca Prairie and Savanna is an  prairie in Iowa County, Wisconsin just north of Avoca on the Wisconsin River. It is the largest intact prairie in Wisconsin and was designated a state natural area in 1968 and a National Natural Landmark in 1980.

References

External links
Official website

Protected areas of Iowa County, Wisconsin
National Natural Landmarks in Wisconsin
Prairies
State Natural Areas of Wisconsin